Philosophy and Phenomenological Research (PPR) is a bimonthly philosophy journal founded in 1940. Until 1980, it was edited by Marvin Farber, then by Roderick Chisholm, and since 1986 by Ernest Sosa. It considers itself open to a variety of methodologies and traditions, as indicated by a statement appearing in each issue: "PPR publishes articles in a wide range of areas including philosophy of mind, epistemology, ethics, metaphysics, and philosophical history of philosophy. No specific methodology or philosophical orientation is required in submissions." It is published by the International Phenomenological Society based at Brown University in Rhode Island, United States.

External links 
 Citation in JSTOR.
 

Philosophy journals
Brown University
Publications established in 1940
Contemporary philosophical literature
Philosophy Documentation Center academic journals